The greater sand plover (Charadrius leschenaultii) is a small wader in the plover family of birds. The spelling is commonly given as "greater sandplover" or "greater sand-plover", but the official British Ornithologists' Union spelling is "Greater Sand Plover". The genus name Charadrius is a Late Latin word for a yellowish bird mentioned in the fourth-century Vulgate. It derives from Ancient Greek kharadrios a bird found in ravines and river valleys (kharadra, "ravine"). The specific leschenaultii commemorates the French botanist Jean Baptiste Leschenault de la Tour.

Distribution

It breeds in the semi-deserts of Turkey and eastwards through Central Asia. It nests in a bare ground scrape. This species is strongly migratory, wintering on sandy beaches in East Africa, South Asia and Australasia. It is a rare vagrant in western Europe, where it has been recorded as far west as Iceland.  It has been spotted twice in North America, the most recent being on May 14, 2009, in Jacksonville, Florida.

Subspecies
There are three subspecies: The nominate, C. l. columbinus and C. l. scythicus. The last was known as C. l. crassirostris until it was established that this name is pre-occupied by a subspecies of Wilson's plover, C. w. crassirostris.

Description
This chunky plover is long-legged and thick-billed. Breeding males have grey backs and white underparts. The breast, forehead and nape are chestnut, and there is a black eye mask. The female is duller, and winter and juvenile birds lack the chestnut, apart from a hint of rufous on the head. Legs are greenish and the bill black.

In all plumages, it is very similar to lesser sand plover, Charadrius mongolus. Separating the species may be straightforward in mixed wintering flocks on an Indian beach, where the difference in size and structure is obvious; it is another thing altogether to identify a lone vagrant to western Europe, where both species are very rare. The problem is compounded in that the Middle Eastern race of the greater sand plover is the most similar to the lesser species.

Ecology
Its food consists of insects, crustaceans and annelid worms, which are obtained by a run-and-pause technique, rather than the steady probing of some other wader groups.

Its flight call is a soft trill.

The greater sand plover is one of the species to which the Agreement on the Conservation of African-Eurasian Migratory Waterbirds (AEWA) applies.

References

Further reading
 Taylor, P.B. (1987) Field identification of Greater and Lesser Sandplovers, pp. 15–20 in International Bird Identification: Proceedings of the 4th International Identification Meeting, Eilat, 1st - 8th November 1986 International Birdwatching Centre Eilat

External links

 Greater sand plover - Species text in The Atlas of Southern African Birds.

greater sand plover
Birds of Central Asia
Birds of Western Asia
greater sand plover
Articles containing video clips
Taxa named by René Lesson